State Highway 3 (SH 3) is a State Highway in Kerala, India that starts at Nedumangad Toll junction and ends at the Kadukkara  near Kerala - Tamilnadu border. The highway is 37.5 km long. This was part of hitherto existed Aralvaimozhi - Nedumangad royal state highway of Travancore. Now a part of it is in Kerala and another in Tamilnadu. The road runs parallel to Western Ghats till the Aralvaimozhi pass.

The stretch of this highway from Anappara near Vellarada till Aryanad is now part of Hill Highway (Kerala). This highway connects tourist destinations such as Koickal Palace Nedumangadu, Neyyar Dam, Neyyar Safari Park, Dravyappara, Thekkan Kurishumala, Elephant Rehabilitation Center Kottur, Chittar Dam and Thripparappu waterfalls.

This road is called as Nedumangad- Shorlacode Road by local people. Shorlacode is a small village near Kulasekaram nearby Perunchani Dam. These days people call it as Surulacode or Churulakode.

Route description 
Nedumangad Toll Jn - Aryanadu - Kuttichal - Paruthipally - Kallikkad - Vazhichal -Kudappanamoodu - Vellarada- Kathipara Junction - Kadukkara - State boundary.

This road continues as State Highway 45 of Tamilnadu for another 48 km from Netta border (Kadukkara) of Tamilnadu via Thirparappu - Kulasekaram - Boothapandi to Aralvaimozhi.

See also 
Roads in Kerala
List of State Highways in Kerala

References 

State Highways in Kerala
Roads in Thiruvananthapuram district